Mattoru Seetha is a 1975 Indian Malayalam-language film, directed by P. Bhaskaran, starring Kamal Haasan, Roja Ramani (credited as Shobana), Sheela, Adoor Bhasi, Bahadoor, Sukumari, Jose Prakash, Prema Menon, M. G. Soman and Vincent. It is a remake of the 1974 Telugu film O Seeta Katha.

Plot 

Seetha, a teenage girl, lives with her mother and elder sister, who runs the house with her harikatha performances. Seetha falls in love with Chandran, but Gopi has an eye on her and hires goons to bash Chandran, who dies on the spot. Seeta marries Menon, father of Gopi, and makes Gopi realize his mistakes.

Cast 
Kamal Haasan as Gopi
Shobana as Seetha
Vincent as Chandran
M. G. Soman
Sheela
Adoor Bhasi
Bahadoor
Jose Prakash
Prema Menon
Sreelatha Namboothiri
Master Raghu (Karan)
Kaviyoor Ponnamma
Sukumari
Paul Vengola

Production 
Mattoru Seetha film was directed by P. Bhaskaran. It is a remake of the 1973 Telugu film O Seetha Katha, directed by K. Vishwanath.

Kamal Haasan played the anti-hero role in the Malayalam version, which was later played by Rajinikanth in the Tamil version.

Soundtrack 
The music was composed by V. Dakshinamoorthy and the lyrics were written by P. Bhaskaran. Playback singer Ayiroor Sadasivan has sung two  songs in this film.

References

External links 
 

1970s Malayalam-language films
1975 films
Malayalam remakes of Telugu films
Films directed by P. Bhaskaran